Altmärkische Wische is a municipality in the district of Stendal, in Saxony-Anhalt, Germany. It was formed on 1 January 2010 by the merger of the former municipalities Falkenberg, Lichterfelde, Neukirchen and Wendemark.

References

 
Stendal (district)